Robert George Murdoch Nisbet, FBA (21 May 1925 – 14 May 2013), known as Robin Nisbet, was a British classicist and academic, specializing in Latin literature. From 1970 to 1992, he was Corpus Christi Professor of Latin at the University of Oxford. 

He was the son of Robert G. Nisbet, who was also a classicist, lecturing at the University of Glasgow for 35 years, and author of a commentary on Cicero's speech De domo sua (1939).

Robin Nisbet was educated at the Glasgow Academy, then as an undergraduate at the University of Glasgow from 1943 to 1947, before going to Balliol College, Oxford, as Snell Exhibitioner to take a further undergraduate degree. After graduating in 1951 he moved to Corpus Christi College, Oxford, where he was appointed a fellow in 1952. He was made a fellow of the British Academy in 1987.

Selected works
Nisbet, R. G. M. (1961). M. Tulli Ciceronis in L. Calpurnium Pisonem oratio. Edited with text, introduction, and commentary. (Reprinted in paperback by the Clarendon Press 1987 )

References

 

 
 
 

1925 births
2013 deaths
British classical scholars
Scholars of Latin literature
Alumni of the University of Glasgow
Corpus Christi Professors of Latin
Fellows of Corpus Christi College, Oxford
Fellows of the British Academy
People educated at the Glasgow Academy